Kunimitsu is a masculine Japanese given name. Notable people with the name include:

, Japanese long-distance runner
, Japanese Grand Prix motorcycle road racer and racing driver
, a Japanese swordsmith during the Einin, Shōwa and Enkyō periods
, Japanese football player

Fictional Characters
, a playable character in the Tekken fighting games
, a character in The Prince of Tennis series

Japanese masculine given names